Zezenia is an affluent neighborhood in Alexandria, Egypt. Famous with Jewelry Museum, and Alexandria governor's house.

Where you’ll find famous lawyers, doctors, and business executives. And while they probably aren't made of ticky tacky, they are definitely made of money.

History 
The history of naming the neighborhood by this name goes back to the Greek "Zezenia", the general consul of "Belgium" in Egypt who realized the importance of the city of "Alexandria", the second capital of Egypt, and bought a land and after a period of time Al-Khawaja "Zezenia" sold part of the land to the government this is to extend the tram line. After extending the line, the area began to be built and people knew it and settled in it, so the area was called the “Zezenia” neighborhood in relation to the first owner of the area, which is the name given to the neighborhood until our time.

Most Famous places: 
 The Royal Jewelry Museum 
 Princess Aziza Fahmy's Palace
 El Safa Palace (Presidential Palace)
Faculty of Fine Arts - Alexandria University
Egyptian American Book Center - EABC
 Ahmed Yahia Pasha (Mosque)
 Specialized Hospital For Gastroenterology & Hepatology
 Banks:
 National Bank of Egypt
 QNB Alahli (Qatar Bank)
 National Bank of Kuwait
 Commercial International Bank - CIB
 The United Bank of Egypt
 Housing & Development Bank - HDB
 Tolip Beach
 West Delta Electricity Production Company - WDEPC
 Radio and Television Building
 Starbucks - Gleem bay
Costa Coffee - Gleem bay
Cilantro Café
 Angelina Kyria Pâtisserie
 Zahran Market (Zezenia)
 Metro Market (Zezenia)

Neighborhoods in Alexandria 

 Bakos, Alexandria
 Bolkly
 El Saraya (neighborhood)
 Fleming (neighborhood)
 Gianaclis
 Glim
 Kafr Abdu
 Louran (neighborhood)
 Louran, Alexandria
 Roshdy
 Saba Pasha
 Safar (neighborhood)
 San Stefano (neighborhood)
 Shods
 Sidi Bishr
 Smouha
 Sporting (neighborhood)
 Stanley (neighborhood)
 Tharwat

Populated places in Alexandria Governorate
Neighbourhoods of Alexandria
Upper class